Hypolimnas chapmani, the Chapman's eggfly, is a butterfly in the family Nymphalidae. It is found in eastern Nigeria and Cameroon. The habitat consists of primary forests.

Adults are probably mimics of Acraea umbra.

References

Butterflies described in 1873
chapmani
Butterflies of Africa
Taxa named by William Chapman Hewitson